Elections to Ballymoney Borough Council were held on 15 May 1985 on the same day as the other Northern Irish local government elections. The election used three district electoral areas to elect a total of 16 councillors.

Election results

Note: "Votes" are the first preference votes.

Districts summary

|- class="unsortable" align="centre"
!rowspan=2 align="left"|Ward
! % 
!Cllrs
! % 
!Cllrs
! %
!Cllrs
! %
!Cllrs
! %
!Cllrs
!rowspan=2|TotalCllrs
|- class="unsortable" align="center"
!colspan=2 bgcolor="" | DUP
!colspan=2 bgcolor="" | UUP
!colspan=2 bgcolor="" | SDLP
!colspan=2 bgcolor="" | Sinn Féin
!colspan=2 bgcolor="white"| Others
|-
|align="left"|Ballymoney Town
|bgcolor="#D46A4C"|39.9
|bgcolor="#D46A4C"|2
|35.0
|2
|0.0
|0
|0.0
|0
|25.1
|1
|5
|-
|align="left"|Bann Valley
|bgcolor="#D46A4C"|41.2
|bgcolor="#D46A4C"|2
|25.1
|2
|13.9
|1
|13.5
|1
|6.3
|0
|6
|-
|align="left"|Bushvale
|bgcolor="#D46A4C"|44.6
|bgcolor="#D46A4C"|2
|31.5
|2
|22.7
|1
|0.0
|0
|1.2
|0
|5
|-
|- class="unsortable" class="sortbottom" style="background:#C9C9C9"
|align="left"| Total
|41.9
|6
|29.9
|6
|12.7
|2
|5.5
|1
|10.0
|1
|16
|-
|}

District results

Ballymoney Town

1985: 2 x DUP, 2 x UUP, 1 x Independent

Bann Valley

1985: 2 x DUP, 2 x UUP, 1 x SDLP, 1 x Sinn Féin

Bushvale

1985: 2 x UUP, 2 x DUP, 1 x SDLP

References

Ballymoney Borough Council elections
Ballymoney